Woodley is a Federal-style hilltop house in Washington, D.C., constructed in 1801. It has served as the home to Grover Cleveland, Martin Van Buren, and Henry L. Stimson, and is now the home of the Maret School. When originally built, it was based on the Woodley Lodge in Reading, England. Coincidentally, given the mansion's original site, the word "Woodley" means "clearing in the woods." A Maret School-based organization called the Woodley Society was created in 1994 to study its history. Since then, it has become an association of students, faculty, and alumni, which has conducted research in a number of archives and libraries in the Greater Metropolitan Washington area and beyond. In 2008, the head of the group, historian Allerton Kilborne, published a book about Woodley. The group's podcast, Echoes of Woodley, is available on Spotify and showcases stories surrounding the mansion.

History of Woodley Mansion
In 1801, Woodley was built by Phillip Barton Key, the uncle of the author of "The Star Spangled Banner," Francis Scott Key. In 1797, Key bought the  wooded estate that Woodley would be built upon. Before the land was sold to Phillip Barton Key, it was owned by Colonel Ninian Beall and Benjamin Stoddert. Once the magnificent Federal-style house was built, it was home to multiple residents, including: Phillip Barton Key, President Martin Van Buren, Lorenzo Thomas, the slave Lucy Berry, Robert J. Walker, Francis Newlands, President Grover Cleveland, William "Billy" Phillips, Sallie Long Ellis, George Patton, Henry Stimson and Adolf Berle.  Henry Stimson left Woodley in his will to his alma mater Phillips Academy, Andover, which in turn sold most of it to the Maret School, founded by the three late French Maret sisters, Marthe, Louise and Jeanne, born and educated in Geneva, Switzerland. They became teachers,  Louise in Russia,  and Jeanne in Germany, in the Philippines and in Washington DC for the Taft children.  Then, both Louise and Jeanne followed university programs in DC and Chevy-Chase, Marthe, who became blind at 18 was also  teaching at Maret School, as were her sisters.  Maret purchased the campus in 1950, after previously being housed in a 1923 building at 2118 Kalorama Road, N.W. Ever since 1950,  the Maret School has owned most of the land, while still taking great care of the well-known mansion. Currently, around 650 students attend the top-tier private school. During Maret's tenure, it has been used to house a learning center, a library, a business office, admissions office, as well as the head of school's office.

Residents

Colonel Ninian Beall
Ninian Beall was an immigrant from Scotland who started his life in America as an indentured servant and ended up as a major landowner and merchant. He bought the site of the future Woodley as part of the 795-acre tract to which he gave the name "The Rock of Dumbarton." It was on the Potomac River,  where Georgetown would eventually be established, that he built a tobacco warehouse, a gristmill, and an iron foundry.

Benjamin Stoddert
Benjamin Stoddert was a successful merchant and veteran of the Revolution who went on to become the first Secretary of the Navy. The appointment came during the "Quasi-War" with France in 1798, when French ships were seizing American vessels on the high seas. Under Stoddert's direction, the American navy not only grew exponentially, but also won the undeclared naval war against France. Earlier in the decade, at the request of George Washington, he had formed a partnership with Uriah Forrest and purchased the site of Woodley and its environs to prevent the land from being bought up by speculators who would then have sold it to the government for huge prices.

Philip Barton Key
Philip Barton Key was born into a prominent family of Maryland planters. He sacrificed his inheritance to fight for a Loyalist regiment in the American Revolution and was eventually captured, paroled and sent to England, where he studied law at the Middle Temple of the Inns at Court. In 1789, he returned to Maryland, married Ann Plater and went on to become the only Loyalist to resurrect his reputation and rise to prominence. Before his death in 1816, he served as both a Federal Judge and a Congressman. During Key's schooling in England, he visited Prime Minister Henry Addington at the Woodley Lodge. When Key returned to Washington, DC, he modeled his own home after the original lodge in England.

Martin Van Buren
Martin Van Buren served as a Senator from New York and later as Andrew Jackson's Vice President before ascending to the Presidency in 1837. When he came into office, the country was plunged into its first depression so he could not do what all his predecessors had done: move away from the heat of Washington during the summer. Instead he rented Woodley because it was on cooler heights above the city and because it was considerably cheaper to run.

Lorenzo Thomas
Lorenzo Thomas was a Union general who played a number of roles during the Civil War era. He was serving as Adjutant General when he stood beside General Ulysses S. Grant aboard the ironclad U.S.S. Magnolia and watched the siege of Vicksburg. Later in the war, he served in Mississippi, where he raised 21,000 black troops. During an assignment in the West, it is believed, he rented Woodley to ex-President James Buchanan. After the war, Thomas served briefly as Secretary of War and was a key player in the impeachment trial of Andrew Johnson. In April 1862, Thomas freed the last of the Woodley slaves—Lucy Berry and her two small sons, George and Lorenzo. It is not known for sure whether or not Lorenzo Thomas fathered these two sons; indeed one son's name was Lorenzo.

Lucy Berry
Lucy Berry, the last of the Woodley slaves, was born in Charles County, Maryland in 1822 on a tobacco plantation called Equality. In 1853, she was bought by Lorenzo Thomas and installed in Woodley as his cook and laundress. In April 1862, Lucy Berry and her two small sons were freed by the District Emancipation Act. Four years later, she was reunited with her husband Denis and her four older children, and the entire Berry family were living together in their own house in East Georgetown. After the end of Reconstruction and the death of Denis Berry, Lucy moved to the Government Hospital of the Insane (now St. Elizabeth's), where she worked as a laundress until her death.

Robert J. Walker
Robert J. Walker was a Mississippi cotton planter, U.S. Representative, and Senator before 1844, when he helped to engineer the election of James K. Polk, the first dark horse candidate elected president. Polk appointed him Secretary of the Treasury. In 1867, he helped persuade Secretary of State William Seward to purchase Alaska from Russia. To keep negotiations on track, the Czar paid Walker a $20,000 bribe, some of which went into the 1867 renovation of Woodley when a third floor was added.

Francis Newlands
Francis Newlands, a beneficiary of the Comstock Silver Mine, was both a politician and a real estate tycoon. As Senator from Nevada, he championed the Newlands Reclamation Act of 1901, which culminated in the irrigation of huge sections of the West. At the local level, he developed Chevy Chase and put in Connecticut Avenue so that the owners of his new development could reach downtown Washington by streetcar. He further enhanced the value of his real estate holdings by helping to create Rock Creek Park. After renting Woodley to the Clevelands in 1893, he added a block of rooms on the east side of the building and moved in himself (circa 1900).

Grover Cleveland
Grover Cleveland was the only President to serve two non-consecutive terms. When he lost the election of 1888, he sold his dream house on the corner of Newark and 36th streets. Therefore, when he won back the Presidency in 1892, he needed a new summer house within striking distance of the White House. His choice was Woodley, which had just been extensively modernized with electricity and state-of-the-art heating and plumbing systems.

William Phillips
William Phillips was a career diplomat and a lifelong friend of Franklin Roosevelt. When he and his wife Caroline rented Woodley (1915–1919), he was Assistant Secretary of State and also the host of numerous dinners attended by the Roosevelts. Phillips went on to a career as ambassador to Belgium, Canada and Italy, where for six years, he tried to keep Mussolini's ambitions in check. He continued to serve in many vital overseas assignments under his old friend Franklin Roosevelt until his official retirement in 1944.

Sallie Long Ellis
Sallie Long Ellis bought Woodley in 1921. Her husband Captain Hayne Ellis had seen action in the Spanish–American War, the Philippine Insurrection and the Boxer Rebellion. He would later become Commander of the Atlantic Squadron. Among the guests who visited Woodley during those years was General John Pershing, commander of the American Expeditionary force in World War I.

Henry Stimson
Henry Stimson, the owner of Woodley from 1929–1950, was a statesman admired on both sides of the aisle. During the Hoover administration, he was the Secretary of State that pushed Hoover towards preparedness, and during the Roosevelt-Truman administrations, he served as Secretary of War, presiding over, among other matters, the development of the atomic bomb. When Stimson and his wife Mabel bought Woodley in 1929, they added cloakrooms (now little offices) on either side of the portico.

Adolf Berle
Adolf Berle, one of the architects of the New Deal, rented Woodley from Stimson in 1939. Once again, Woodley became the place of high drama. On the evening of September 1, Whittaker Chambers arrived at Woodley to tell Berle that Alger Hiss, a highly respected member of the State Department, was passing top-secret documents to the Soviets. That accusation would eventually culminate in the trial of Hiss. (He was found guilty of perjury and went to prison.)  Among the many guests at Woodley during the Berle year was Secretary of State Cordell Hull, who would sneak away during afternoons to play croquet on the Woodley croquet lawn; Albert Einstein, who came to a Woodley reception; and Charles W. Yost, Berle's assistant, who was invited to view Julian Bryan's horrifying photographs of the Warsaw siege.

See also
 List of residences of presidents of the United States

References

External links
 Amazon.com (Woodley and Its Residents)
 Woodley Society Website

Houses in Washington, D.C.
Federal architecture in Washington, D.C.
Key family of Maryland
Beall family of Maryland